Peuple en marche is a 1963 documentary film.

Synopsis 
In 1962, René Vautier, together with some Algerian friends, organized an audiovisual formation center to encourage a "dialogue in images" between the two factions. A film was edited from that experience, but the French police partially destroyed it. The images that were saved represent an unprecedented historical document: They tell of the Algerian War and the history of the ALN (National Liberation Army), as well as showing life after the war and, particularly, the reconstruction of the cities and the countryside after the war of Independence.

External links
 
 

1963 films
Creative Commons-licensed documentary films
1963 documentary films
Algerian documentary films
Algerian War films
Documentary films about African cinema
Documentary films about African resistance to colonialism
Films directed by René Vautier